The Isle of Man Railway Museum in the village of Port Erin in the Isle of Man is a small museum of the history of the Isle of Man Railway from its founding in 1873 to the present, including the now-closed lines that served Peel, Ramsey and Foxdale, and the remaining line to Port Erin which forms part of the southern terminus.

History
The museum first opened in 1975 when the Isle of Man Road Services, a subsidiary of the railway company, relocated to their new garage, which still exists today at the foot of the main platform.  At that time, the railway operated only between Port Erin and Castletown, in an experimental season with the goal of reducing running costs. The following year, services were extended to Ballasalla, then returned to Douglas in 1977, after which the full line has operated. The museum building, originally consisting of a metal frame with asbestos cladding, was extensively rebuilt in 1999. A souvenir shop was subsequently added in the goods shed, where locomotives were originally kept overnight. Prior to the museum's opening, the original locomotive shed was used to store unserviceable locomotives. When the museum was rebuilt, the locomotive shed was returned to its original use and the goods shed converted into a shop area and a new porch added.

Location

The museum is situated beside the Port Erin railway station which is the southern terminus of the railway, on Station Road in the village, on its junction with Strand Road which leads to the beach. The original entrance was situated on the corner of these two roads, latterly made into a public seating area.  The main exhibition hall is housed in a converted bus garage that once belonged to Isle of Man Road Services, itself a division of the old railway company which was nationalised in 1976.  Since the museum was extensively rebuilt in 1998-1999 part of the old goods shed has been incorporated into the complex, the other locomotive shed still being used as a workshop to maintain the locomotives and for overnight storage purposes.  The museum is accessible from the station platform off the train, or by car parking in the nearby car park.

Shop & Opening Times

The souvenir shop is in the entrance / exit area to the museum itself and is accessed via Station Road at the foot of the platform.  The shop has a small range of memorabilia including books, postcards, stationery, ephemera, replica nameplates and generic souvenirs.  The stock of the shop is now a fraction of what was available in the boom of the centenary seasons beginning with the Year of Railways in 1993 and extending to Steam 125 in 1998.  A nominal admission price is charged for entry and the opening times tie in with the operational dates of the railway itself.  The shop is in the old goods shed and features a station-type building as a staff/store room as well as old luggage trolleys and framed displays before entering the museum proper.  The museum is open daily throughout the summer months, at the same time as the railway which is usually between March and the beginning of November each year. A small admission price is charged for entry for those not in possession of a valid railway ticket.

Exhibits

Since it originally opened in 1975, the railway museum has housed a variety of major exhibits.  Exhibits in the museum include two engines and two coaches as well as other equipment from the railway.  The royal carriages, as used by Queen Elizabeth the Queen Mother in 1963 and by Queen Elizabeth II in 1972, are preserved in the museum.  There is also a large display of photographs, posters and other memorabilia.  In addition to the framed exhibits of old posters and the like, further displays are mounted on the walls of the station building itself in the waiting room and booking office. These were once part of the museum and donated by a preservationists group when the facility was first opened.

 No. 1 Sutherland of 1873 (Arrived 1976, Removed 1997, Returned 2020)
 No. 4 Loch of 1874 (Arrived 1997, Removed 2001)
 No. 6 Peveril of 1875 (Arrived 2002, Removed 2020 For Asbestos Removal, Returned 2021)
 No. 16 Mannin of 1926 (Arrived 1975, Removed 2020 For Assessment)
 F.75 The Governor's Saloon (Arrived 1975, Extant)
 F.36 The Queen's Saloon (Arrived 1976, Extant)
 N.42 Six-Wheeled Carriage (Arrived 1976, Removed 1998)
 Manx Northern Van Gr.12 of 1879 (Arrived 1976, Removed 1998)
 Former Brake Van G.19 of 1921 (Arrived 2013, Extant)
 Workshops' Wood-Turning Lathe (Arrived 1988, Extant)
 Original (1873) Carriage Door (Arrived 2004, Extant)
 Mock-Up Station Masters' Office (Created 1999, Relocated 2019)
 Permanent Way Diorama Display (Created 2013, Extant)
 Wagons H.1 & M.78 (Various Times, Between Usage)

Displays

 Framed Original Ticket Displays
 Photographs Of All Locomotives
 Old Planes & Lathes From Workshops
 Recreation Of Station Master's Office
 An Old Snow Plough From The Line
 Visual Display Boards Charting Histories

Gallery

See also

 Isle of Man Railway
 Isle of Man Railway stations
 Isle of Man Railway locomotives
 Isle of Man Railway rolling stock
 Isle of Man Steam Railway Supporters' Association
 British narrow-gauge railways

References

 James I.C. Boyd Isle Of Man Railway, Volume 3, The Routes & Rolling Stock (1996) 
 Norman Jones Scenes from the Past: Isle of Man Railway (1994) 
 Robert Hendry Rails in the Isle of Man: A Colour Celebration (1993) 
 A.M Goodwyn Manx Transport Kaleidoscope, 2nd Edition (1995)

Transport museums in the Isle of Man
Isle of Man Railway
Railway museums in the United Kingdom